The 1952 McNeese State Cowboys football team was an American football team that represented McNeese State College (now known as McNeese State University) as a member of the Gulf States Conference (GSC) during the 1952 college football season. In their seventh year under head coach Albert I. Ratcliff, the team compiled an overall record of 7–3 with a mark of 2–3 in conference play, and finished fourth in the GSC.

Schedule

References

McNeese State
McNeese Cowboys football seasons
McNeese State Cowboys football